Bahdinan or Badinan was one of the most powerful and enduring Kurdish principalities. It was founded by Baha-al-Din originally from Şemzînan area in Hakkari in sometime between 13th or 14th century CE. The capital of this emirate was Amadiya for a long time. The rulers of the Bahdinan emirate governed over the Emirate since the Abbasid Empire, an early dynasty in Islamic history.

It was centered in the town of Amadiya (or Amêdî) in the present-day Dahuk province in Iraqi Kurdistan. According to Evliya Celebi the principality was divided into the following districts:

Aqra, Zakho, Shikhoyi, Duhok, Zibari, and Muzuri.

The districts were autonomous units under their own rulers who were appointed by the Khan of Amadiya. In addition to this, there were tribal chieftains with formalized positions (for example, the chiefs of the Sindi and Silvane tribes needed confirmation from the ruler of Zakho).

The principality reached its peak during the reign of Bahram Pasha the Great (re. 1726–1767).

Threatened by the expansionist and centralizing efforts of the Ottoman and Safavid empires, Bahdinan princes were drawn into prolonged confrontations with these two rival powers. The Bahdinan rulers, Esmail Pasha and Mohammad Said Pasha  were deposed by the emir of the neighboring Soran principality in 1831. However, their rule was restored after the Ottomans defeated Soran in 1836. Although the Soran influence lasted only for a few years, the Bahdinan principality never fully recovered. Pursuing their centralization policy, the Ottomans overthrew the Bahdinan principality in 1843 (or 1838) and incorporated it in the Sandjak of Mosul.

The most famous ancient library in the region, in the Qubehan school at Amadiya, was destroyed by British troops putting down a revolt in the region in 1919, although some 400 manuscripts were rescued and eventually found their way into the Iraq Museum's collection.

References

Bahdinan, Encyclopædia Iranica, p. 485, By Amir Hassanpour.
Bahdīnān , The Encyclopaedia of Islam, Brill Academic Publishers.

See also
 Bahdini

Former Kurdish states in Iraq
Dohuk Governorate
Former principalities
Geography of Iraqi Kurdistan
1376 establishments in Asia
1370s in the Middle East